Tab Martin (born Alan Raymond Brearley, December 24, 1944) is an English bass guitarist. He has been a member of well-known English bands from the 1960s. He was a member of the Tornados and played on their hit "Globetrotter". He was also a member of the Peddlers and played on their hits "Birth" and "Girlie". He also founded 1960s group the Saints.

Background
Martin was born in Newcastle on December 24, 1944. Martin was known for his technique of playing his bass in an upright fashion.

Career
Martin became a member of the Tornados when he replaced Chris Hodges. He left the group a month after they released the single "Globetrotter" and was replaced by former Pirates member Brian Gregg. He went on to form his own band, the Saints.  In April 1964, along with Roy Phillips and Trevor Morais, Martin formed the Peddlers.  The Peddlers had a minor hit with "Let the Sunshine", followed by a top twenty hit with "Birth" and followed by another hit, "Girlie".  The group's album Birthday which was released on Epic also charted.  Martin continued with the Peddlers, with New Zealand drummer Paul Johnston replacing Morais in 1972. He stayed with the group until their breakup in the mid-1970s. After that, he became a session musician.

Later years
Martin produced a single for the Otis Waygood Band. The single "Get It Started" b/w "Red Hot Passion" was released on Decca in 1977. He also produced "Making Up Again" which was a hit single for UK group Goldie. In 1978, he and Dominic De Sousa were working for MAM Records. They worked together, producing the "Disco Hell" single for Dafne and the Tenderspots which was released the following year.

Further reading
 Thunderbolt, Issue 55 - Mark Newson covers Tab Martin's career in the Tornados
 Beat Instrumental, Feb. 1968 - Peddlars Tab Martin Started as a C&W Musician By Mike Clifford

References

Rory Storm and the Hurricanes members
English bass guitarists
Musicians from Newcastle upon Tyne
The Peddlers members
The Tornados members
1944 births
Living people
The Saints (British band) members